Enerco Energy is a natural gas company in Turkey.  It was established in 2004. 60% of Enerco Energy belongs to Akfel Group, a Turkish energy engineering, construction, equipment production, and consultancy company, and 40% belongs to OMV Gas & Power.

The company started importing of natural gas in  April 2009 being the largest importer after Botaş.

See also
List of companies of Turkey

References 

Oil and gas companies of Turkey
Turkish companies established in 2004
Non-renewable resource companies established in 2004